Tamer Levent (born 13 October 1950) is a Turkish actor, director, art director and writer. In 1971, he joined the Ankara State Conservatory and entered the Department of Theater. He graduated from the conservatory's Department of theater in 1977. He first worked as an actor and then as a director in State Theaters. He later served as general director of State Theaters and deputy general director. Through the plays that he directed, he received invitations to festivals in Russia, Canada, South Korea, Iran and North Cyprus. He is currently the director of the State Theaters and is the founder and first President of TOMEB, the Association of Theater Actors Professional Association (TOBAV).

Early life and family 

Levent was born on 13 October 1950 in Karşıyaka, İzmir as the son of judge Zeki Levent and his wife, designer Meral Levent. He attended high school at İzmir Turkish College. In 1982, he was married to Seynan Sezgin, the producer and presenter of TRT 2's popular program Aksama Dogu. In 1984, their son Efe and in 1985 their daughter Hazel were born. On 25 March 1994, he was elected as the General Director of State Theaters. During his duty, which he carried out until 10 August 1994, he initiated the Yes to Art project, which made a great impression in Turkey. He made theoretical and practical studies in order to define and expand the theater culture. In 2003, Çorlu Municipality opened a new stage in his name (Çorlu Municipality Tamer Levent Scene) after which Levent began promoting drama education in Turkey and launched creative drama activities. He performed on the first Russian tour of the State Theaters with Ülkü Ayvaz's play Yeniden Yaratma.

Career 

He has taught Creative Acting at the Ankara University Faculty of Educational Sciences, Anadolu University, New York University's Department of Theater, the Berlin High School of Art's Theater Department, Bretton Hall College, and the University of Warwick. In Belgium, Luxembourg and Hungary, he participated in the committees and organizations where the principles of theater gatherings were organized together with the European Parliament and conducted a series of workshops. Levent made long-term workshops in France and Tunisia and turned the results into performances. He also performed a series of programs and dramas on radio and television. He made a live communication program with the audience at TRT Radyo-1 called Gecenin İçinden. He made documentaries in China and India. He has directed drama workshops in many countries around the world. In the adaptation of the play Bernarda Alba'nın Evi to the ballet, he was in charge of the direction. Levent is also the Representative of Turkey at the International Federation of Actors (FIA). He was a member of the board of IATA (International Association of Amateur Theaters). His articles were published in local and foreign journals. In addition to acting and directing, Tamer Levent is the President of the TOBAV (State Theater Opera and Ballet Employees Foundation).

Theatre and opera

As actor 

 İstanbul Efendisi - Musahipzade Celal, 1975 (held a tour in Cyprus)
 My Fair Lady (Musical) – based on Bernard Shaw's Pygmalion - 1977 Ankara State Theater
 The Misanthrope – Molière, 1977 Ankara State Theater
 New Sufferings of Young W. - Ulrich Plenzdorf, 1977 Ankara State Theater
 Billy Budd - Herman Melville, 1978
 Sultan Kız (children play) - Osman Güngör Feyzoğlu,
 Monserrat - Emmanuel Roblès, 1979
 Liberated Don Quixote – Anatoly Lunacharsky
 The Resistible Rise of Arturo Ui - Bertolt Brecht
 Keşanlı Ali Destanı - Haldun Taner
 Bir Sabah Gülerek Uyan - Necati Cumalı
 Voll auf der Rolle - Leonie Ossowski
 Everlasting Husband - Victor Heim
 Ivona, Princess of Burgundia - Witold Gombrowicz
 Matmazel Helsinka - Georgas Astalos
 Karacaoğlan – Dinçer Sümer
 Sanatçının Ölümü – Yılmaz Onay
 Tartuffe – Molière
 Path of Dreams - Tennessee Williams
 Yaşamaya Dair - adapted by Tamer Levent based on a work by Nâzım Hikmet
 Ramazan'la Cülide – Erhan Gökgücü
 Happy New Year – Peter Turrini, 2008 Beşiktaş Municipality; Akatlar Cultural Center; Istanbul
 Life of Galileo – Bertolt Brecht, 2008 Ankara State Theater
 Yalancının Resmi - Memet Baydur, 2009 Mask-Kara Theater, Istanbul
 The Merchant of Venice - William Shakespeare, 2012 Ankara State Theater
 Rain Man - Dan Gordon, 2013 Tiyatro Keyfi Istanbul
 Kuvayi Milliye (Kurtuluş Savaşı Destanı) - Nazım Hikmet, 2014 Tiyatro 2000 Istanbul
 Equus, 2016 - Müstesna Theater, Peter Shaffer

As director 
* Uyandığımda Sesim Yoktu
 Bir Elin Nesi Var (children play) - Muharrem Buhara
 Bütün Dünya Oyun Sahnesi - Tamer Levent
 The House of Bernarda Alba - Federico Garcia Lorca (TV dance theater project with Binnaz Aydan's choreography)
 Yeniden Yaratma-oyun-Ülkü Ayvaz, ilk SSCB turnesi
 Önce İnsan - Yılmaz Karakoyunlu (Canada tour)
 Masal Kadınları - Tamer Levent (South Korea, Iran tour)
 Carmen - Georges Bizet, İzmir State Opera and Ballet
 Man of La Mancha - Don Quixote, Mersin State Opera and Ballet
 Yaşamaya Dair - Nâzım Hikmet (scenario), Ankara State Opera and Ballet (Ali Aykaç made the music for this one-man play and Tamer Levent played his role in the presence of the opera orchestra.)
 Caligula - Albert Camus
 Bakkhai - Euripides
 Kalpaklılar - adapted by Tamer Levent based on a work by Samim Kocagöz
 Ney Dans Prodüksiyonu - scenario by Tamer Levent (This show, where Tamer Levent was the director and art director, toured all over the world.)
 Ferhat ile Şirin - Nazım Hikmet, Ankara
 A Place with the Pigs - Athol Fugard, İzmir Theater
 Midas'ın Kulakları - Güngör Dilmen, Konya State Tiyatrosu
 Yalancının Resmi - Memet Baydur, Istanbul, Mask-Kara Theater
 Ölümü Yaşamak - Orhan Asena, Diyarbakır - Diyarbakır State Theater
 Ak Kartalın Oğlu Gılgameş - Orhan Asena, Diyarbakır State Theater, 2012 (The play was performed on stage for the opening of the Orhan Asena Stage.)

As writer 

 Bütün Dünya Bir Oyun Sahnesi
 Ya Tutarsa
 Karısına Göre Bir Halk Düşmanı
 Anla Beni
 Masal Kadınları

Films and TV series 

 Tatlı Rüyalar, 1997 - Ahmet Akbayır
 Yazılar Filmatik - based on Yılmaz Onay'novel and filmed in 1998 with Altuğ Savaşal's script.
 Sam Rüzgarı (Poland)
 Gülpare
 Yaralı Yürek
 Vazgeç Gönlüm
 Akşamdan Kalma, 2008 - Ali Haydar
 Akşamdan Kalma 2, 2010 - Ali Haydar
 Kılıç Günü - Celal Kızıltan
 Akşamdan Kalma 3, 2012 - Ali Haydar
 Tepenin Ardı - Emin Alper, 2012 It was selected the Best Film at the 2012 Berlin International Film Festival, Forum section (Caligari Film Prize). It was also named the Best Film at the International Istanbul Film Festival. At the 6th Asia Pacific Cinema Academy Awards (APSA), it was awarded as the Best Themed Film.
 Ayaz - Hakan Kurşun, 2012
 Atlılar - Muharrem Gülmez, 2012
 İzzet Kaptan ve Oğlu - Mesut Uçakan
 Su ve Ateş, 2013 - Özcan Deniz
 Yunus Diye Göründüm - Kürşat Kızbaz
 Simindis Kundzuli (Mısır Adası) - 2014
 Fatih, Kanal D, as Ali Kuşçu
 Kış Uykusu, 2014 - Nuri Bilge Ceylan (It received the Palme d'Or at the 2014 Cannes Film Festival and was chosen as the Best Film by FIPRESCI. )
 Bana Artık Hicran De, Kanal D, 2014
 Corn Island, 2014, Georgian film in which he appeared as a soldier. It made it to the January Shortlist for the Best Foreign Language Film at the 87th Academy Awards.
 Misafir - Mehmet Eryılmaz, 2015
 Aşk Yeniden, Fox TV, 2015-2016 (Şevket Taşkin)
 125 Years Memory, 2015 - Mitsutoshi Tanaka (Süleyman Bey)
 Cesur ve Güzel, Star TV, 2016-2017 (Tahsin Korludağ)
 İstanbullu Gelin, Kanal D, 2017–2019 (Garip Selimer)
 Çiçero, 2019 (Sir Hughe Knatchbull-Hugessen)
 Maria ile Mustafa, ATV, 2020 (Kudret Candemir)
 Menajerimi Ara, Star TV, 2021 (Himself)
 Camdaki Kız, Kanal D, 2021–2022 (Rafet Koroğlu)

International judging panel memberships 

 7th Asia Pacific Cinema Academy Awards (APSA) - judge
 Ankara Short Film Festival - judge (2014 with EU cooperation)

Adaptations 

 Efruz Bey - Ömer Seyfettin, Sıfırdan Publications
 Ben ki Abdülcanbaz, Sıfırdan Publications

Books 

 Niçin Tiyatro (articles), Gündoğan Publications
 Ya Tutarsa (play), Mitos - Boyut Publications

Awards 

 45th Ankara Arts Association Theater Awards 2009, "Best Actor" award
 6th Asia Pacific Cinema Academy awards (APSA); He was selected as the best actor nominee with two other country nominees for his role in the movie Tepenin Ardı.
 He was chosen as the best actor at the 24th Ankara Film Festival for his role in the film Tepenin Ardı.
 At the 3rd Malatya Film Festival, he was selected as the best actor with his co-stars, Mehmet Özgür, Reha Özcan, Berk Hakman, and Furkan Berk Kiran.
 81st Language Festival Honorary Award 2013 Language Association
 20th Sadri Alışık Theater and Cinema Actor Awards Selection Committee Special Award (Kış Uykusu)
 4th New Magazine Theater Awards 2016 Honor Award
 2016 İsmet Küntay Honor Award
 TAKSAV 21st International Ankara Theater Festival "Festival Honorary Award" 2016

References

External links 

 
 Tamer Levent's writings on Tiyatronline.com

Turkish dramatists and playwrights
Turkish male film actors
Turkish male stage actors
Turkish male television actors
Turkish theatre directors
People from Karşıyaka
1950 births
Living people